Tel Gerisa or Tell Jerishe and Tell Jarisha (Arabic), commonly known as Tel Napoleon, as his army camped on it during the siege of Jaffa, is an archaeological site in Tel Aviv, Israel, on the southern bank of the Yarkon River. The main phases of the site are dated to the Middle and Late Bronze Ages, with a smaller settlement in Iron Age I and going into decline in Iron Age II (10th century BCE).

Tel Napoleon became part of Tel Aviv on 10 January 1946.

Excavation history
Eliezer Sukenik led the excavations at the site between 1927 and 1951 on behalf of the Hebrew University of Jerusalem. The Israel Department of Antiquities excavated the site in 1976 (Yigal Yadin and Shulamit Geva). Tel Aviv University's Institute of Archaeology explored the tell between 1981 and 1995 under the direction of Ze'ev Herzog.

Identification
The tell is about 500 meters south of the site of the former Arab village Jerisha. The original Bronze and Iron Age name of the settlement is unknown.

However, Anson Rainey was convinced that Gath-rimmon is identical with Gittaim and is to be found at or near Ramla.

References

Further reading

 Geva, Shulamit [1982], Tell Jerishe: The Sukenik Excavations of the Middle Bronze Age Fortifications, Jerusalem: IES, 1982. Qedem15
 Herzog, Zeev
[1983], IEJ 33 (1983), pp. 121–123.
[1984], IEJ 34 (1984), pp. 55–56.
[1988-1989], HA-ESI 7-8 (1988–1989), pp. 60–62.
[1989–1990], HA-ESI 9 (1989–1990), pp. 51–52.
 Herzog, Zeev and Tsuk, T. [1996], "Tell Gerisa - 1991/1992", HA-ESI 15 (1996), pp. 60–62.
 Rainey, Anson F. [1990], "Tel Gerisa and the Danite Inheritance", in Zeevy, R. (ed.), Israel — People and Land, Eretz Israel Museum Yearbook, 5-6 (23-24) — 5748-9 (1987-9), Tel Aviv: Eretz Israel Museum, 1990, pp. 59–72.
Golan, Dor
(30/10/2016) Tel Gerisa (A): Final Report, HA-ESI 128 (2016)
(30/10/2016) Tel Gerisa (B): Final Report, HA-ESI 128 (2016)

Archaeological sites in Israel
Tribe of Dan